Erich P. Ippen is a principal investigator in the Research Laboratory of Electronics (RLE) at the Massachusetts Institute of Technology (MIT). He holds appointments as the Elihu Thomson Professor of Electrical Engineering Emeritus and Professor of Physics Emeritus. He is one of the leaders of RLE’s Optics and Quantum Electronics Group.

Ippen was elected a member of the National Academy of Engineering in 1985 for pioneering contributions to nonlinear optics in optical waveguides and ultrashort-optical-pulse-generation techniques. In 1989 he was also elected a Fellow of the American Physical Society "for his pioneering work in the generation, measurement, and application to physical systems of picosecond and femtosecond light pulses"  Professor Ippen is also a member of the National Academy of Sciences and is a fellow of the American Academy of Arts and Sciences.

In 1997 he was awarded the Arthur L. Schawlow Prize in Laser Science. He was president of the Optical Society of America in 2000. In 2004 the Charles Hard Townes Award and in 2006 the Frederic Ives Medal.

References

External links
 Articles Published by early OSA Presidents  Journal of the Optical Society of America

Year of birth missing (living people)
Living people
Fellow Members of the IEEE
Fellows of the American Academy of Arts and Sciences
Members of the United States National Academy of Engineering
Members of the United States National Academy of Sciences
MIT School of Engineering faculty
Presidents of Optica (society)
21st-century American physicists
Fellows of the American Physical Society
Optical physicists